The 2015–16 NLEX Road Warriors season was the 2nd season of the franchise in the Philippine Basketball Association (PBA).

Key dates
August 23: The 2015 PBA draft took place in Midtown Atrium, Robinson Place Manila.

Draft picks

Roster

Philippine Cup

Eliminations

Standings

Playoffs

Bracket

Commissioner's Cup

Eliminations

Standings

Playoffs

Bracket

Governors' Cup

Eliminations

Standings

Bracket

Transactions

Trades
Off-season

Recruited imports

References

NLEX Road Warriors seasons
NLEX